Laura Lau (born March 31, 1963) is an American writer, director, and producer, perhaps best known as the writer of the films Open Water (2005) and Silent House (2011), the latter of which she co-directed with Chris Kentis.

Biography 
On March 31, 1963, Lau was born as Laura J. Lau in San Francisco, California, U.S. Lau's parents are Chinese-American.

Lau studied writing at Barnard College.

Lau's first feature, Grind (1997), was written by her and directed by Chris Kentis. She would co-produce and shoot Open Water in 2003, on a budget of $120,000; the film would go on to gross $58.7 million worldwide. Her third feature, Silent House (2011), was co-directed, written, and produced by Lau, along with Kentis.

Lal has been married to Kentis, her film collaborator, since 1997, and they reside in New York City. They have one daughter.

Filmography
Grind (1997) – writer, producer
Open Water (2003) – producer, cinematographer
Silent House (2011) – writer, producer, director

References

External links

1963 births
Living people
American film directors of Chinese descent
American writers of Chinese descent
Barnard College alumni
Writers from San Francisco
Film directors from San Francisco
American screenwriters